Lacus Excellentiae (Latin excellentiae, "Lake of Excellence") is a relatively small, irregular lunar mare in the southern latitudes of the Moon, amidst the rugged terrain to the south of the larger Mare Humorum. The most prominent feature within the diameter of this basin is the small crater Clausius.

The name of this lunar lake is a relatively recent addition to lunar nomenclature, being officially approved in 1976 by the IAU General Assembly.

The Lacus Excellentiae was the impact site of the SMART-1 lunar orbiter. This probe impacted the lunar surface on September 3, 2006 and was observed by astronomers to determine the properties of the ejected materials.

References

External links
 
 LAC-110, lunar chart from Gazetteer of Planetary Nomenclature

Excellentiae, Lacus